Beauty Museum or Museum of Enduring Beauty is a museum about beauty standards and concepts in Malacca City, Malacca, Malaysia, which was opened in 1996. It occupies the top floor of the former Historical City Municipal Council building, originally constructed in the 1960s and believed to be built on top of the ruins of Dutch building, which also houses the People's Museum and Kite Museum at the ground and the upper floor respectively.

The museum exhibits the standard of beauty since ancient until modern times and different concepts of beauty as practiced by different cultures. Among those different beauty concepts are skin tattooing, lip stretching by round discs insertion, tooth feeling, sacrification, head molding into oval shapes and feet growth restricting. It opens everyday from 9.00 a.m. to 5.00 p.m.

See also
 List of museums in Malaysia
 List of tourist attractions in Malacca

References

1996 establishments in Malaysia
Museums established in 1996
Museums in Malacca